Stites may refer to:

People
Doctor Stites (fl. 1868), politician in Mississippi
 Gary Stites (born 1940), singer
 Matt Stites (born 1990), baseballer
 Richard Stites (1931–2010), historian
 Tyler Stites (born 1998), cyclist
 Wendy Stites (born 1949), Australian costume designer (also known as Wendy Weir)

Places
 Stites, Idaho
 Stites, Kentucky
 Stites Township, St. Clair County, Illinois

See also
 Stites House, Cincinnati
 Stites & Harbison, law firm